Watergate is a census-designated place in Palm Beach County, Florida, United States. Its population was 3,459 as of the 2020 census. Watergate is located on the west side of U.S. Route 441, west of Boca Raton.

Demographics

References

Census-designated places in Palm Beach County, Florida
Census-designated places in Florida